The women's 100 metres at the 2009 World Championships in Athletics was held at the Olympic Stadium on August 16 and August 17. The Jamaican team had three strong contenders for the 100 m title in defending champion Veronica Campbell-Brown, Olympic champion Shelly-Ann Fraser, and Kerron Stewart (who ran 10.75 seconds in July; the fastest in nine years). The American squad featured Muna Lee, Lauryn Williams, and an in-form Carmelita Jeter. Other medal contenders are Bahamians Debbie Ferguson-McKenzie and Chandra Sturrup, and Kelly-Ann Baptiste, who have all run under eleven seconds prior to the tournament.

Jeter was the fastest qualifier in the heats, and finished 0.02 seconds outside her personal best to win her quarter-final. Stewart was the fastest in the quarterfinals with 10.92 seconds, and Campbell-Brown won her race as the third athlete to run under eleven seconds that day. On the second day of competition, Shelly-Ann Fraser ran the fastest ever semi-final in 10.79 seconds, with Stewart just behind in 10.84 seconds. Jeter ran a personal best of 10.83 seconds to reach the final, in which half the competitors were Jamaican.

In the final, a quick start saw Fraser lead from the outset of the race and Stewart's late challenge was not enough to beat her compatriot. Stewart's personal-best-equalling 10.75 seconds earned her the silver medal, and Jeter took the bronze with a 10.90 second run, somewhat short of the time she produced in the semi-finals. The 2007 gold and silver medallists ran season's bests but missed out on the medals, with Campbell-Brown in fourth (10.95) and Williams in fifth (11.01). Fraser's win in 10.73 seconds was a Jamaican record and made her the joint third fastest 100 m athlete ever with Christine Arron. Furthermore, she became only the second woman to win consecutive Olympic and World Championship titles, after Gail Devers.  As amazing as her start appeared, Fraser only had the fourth fastest reaction time in the field.

Medalists

Records
Prior to the competition, the following records were as follows.

Qualification standards

Schedule

Results

Heats
Qualification: First 3 in each heat(Q) and the next 5 fastest(q) advance to the quarterfinals.

Quarterfinals
Qualification: First 3 in each heat(Q) and the next 4 fastest(q) advance to the semifinals.

Semifinals
First 4 of each Semifinal qualified directly (Q) for the final.

Semifinal 1

Semifinal 2

Final

References
General
100 metres results (Archived 2009-09-08). IAAF. Retrieved on 2009-08-16.
Specific

100
100 metres at the World Athletics Championships
2009 in women's athletics